Matus can be both a given name and surname. Common variants include Matúš, Matuš, and Matůš. Notable people with the name include:

Given name
Matus
 Matus Bisnovat (1905–1977), Soviet aircraft and missile designer
 Matus Tomko (born 1978), Slovak opera singer

Matúš
 Matúš Bero (born 1995), Slovak football midfielder
 Matúš Bubeník (born 1990), Slovak high jump athlete
 Matúš Čonka (born 1990), Slovak football left back
 Matúš Chovan (born 1992), Slovak ice hockey player
 Matúš Digoň (born 1988), Slovak football player
 Matúš Hruška (born 1994), Slovak football goalkeeper
 Matúš Kira (born 1994), Slovak football goalkeeper
 Matúš Kostúr (born 1980), Slovak ice hockey goaltender
 Matúš Kozáčik (born 1983), Slovak football goalkeeper
 Matúš Jorík (born 1993), Slovak football striker
 Matúš Lacko (born 1987), Slovak football midfielder
 Matúš Leskovjanský Slovak ice hockey player
 Matúš Macík (born 1993), Slovak football goalkeeper
 Matúš Marcin, Slovak football forward
 Matúš Mikuš (born 1991), Slovak football forward
 Matúš Opatovský (born 1994), Slovak football midfielder
 Matúš Paločko, Slovak ice hockey player
 Matúš Paukner (born 1991), Slovak football forward
 Matúš Pekár (born 1984), Slovak football striker
 Matúš Putnocký (born 1984), Slovak football goalkeeper 
 Matúš Ružinský (born 1992), Slovak football goalkeeper
 Matúš Turňa (born 1986), Slovak football defender
 Matúš Viedenský (born 1992), Slovak ice hockey player
 Matúš Vizváry (born 1989), Slovak ice hockey player
 Matúš Kubica (born 1994), Slovak poet and video game developer
 Matúš Takáč (born 1992, Košice),
Just Slovak.

Surname
Matus
 Alejandra Matus, Chilean journalist and writer
 Irvin Leigh Matus (1941–2011), American scholar, autodidact and author
 Michael Matus (disambiguation), multiple people, including:
Michael Matus (canoeist), Czechoslovak sprint canoeist
Michael Matus (actor), British actor
 Victorino Matus, assistant managing editor at The Weekly Standard

Matuš
 Radim Matuš (born 1993), Czech ice hockey player
 Željko Matuš (born 1935), Croatian footballer

Matúš
 Martin Matúš (born 1982), Slovak football player

Matůš
 Lukáš Matůš (born 1980), Czech football forward

Surnames of Chilean origin
Surnames of Mexican origin
Matuš